Israel Folau is a Tongan Australian international rugby union player. Folau started his international career with Australia (2013–2019) and primarily played as a fullback for them, however was deployed as a wing and also an outside centre as well. While Folau was playing for Australia internationally, he played for the New South Wales Waratahs in the Super Rugby. He made his international debut for Australia against the British & Irish Lions during ther 2013 tour series, scoring the first try of the match, and of the game.

After his contract with the Australian Rugby Union (ARU) was axed in 2019, Folau racked up a total of thirty-seven tries in seventy-three matches, and became the fourth highest try-scoring Australian player.  

In 2021, following eligibility changes made by World Rugby, Folau was eligible to play for Tonga. Folau changed allegiance to play for Tonga, and was selected to the Tongan squad for the 2022 Pacific Nations Cup.

International tries

List of International tries

Tries by opponent

References

Folau, Israel
International tries by Folau, Israel
International tries by Folau, Israel